Mount Rose K-8 School of Languages, formerly Mount Rose Elementary School, is a public K-8 school at 915 Lander St. in Reno, Nevada, operated by the Washoe County School District. It occupies a historic Mission/Spanish Revival-style facility that was built in 1912 and extended in 1938.  It was listed on the National Register of Historic Places in 1977 under the name Mount Rose Elementary.

The school is "a rare example" of Mission Revival style surviving in the Reno area.

Some students zoned to Mount Rose are also zoned to Swope Middle School and Reno High School. Others are zoned to Clayton Middle School or Vaughn Middle School and Earl Wooster High School.

References

External links 
 Mount Rose K-8 School of Languages

National Register of Historic Places in Reno, Nevada
Mission Revival architecture in Nevada
School buildings completed in 1912
Schools in Reno, Nevada
School buildings on the National Register of Historic Places in Nevada
1912 establishments in Nevada
Public K–8 schools in the United States
Public middle schools in Nevada
Washoe County School District